Unar may refer to:

Unar (lens)
Unar, Iran
The Unarchiver